Manticora may refer to:
Manticora (genus), a genus of beetles
Manticora latipennis, a species of tiger beetle native to South Africa
Manticora scabra, a species of tiger beetle native to Mozambique and Zimbabwe
Manticora (band), a heavy metal band from Hvidovre, Denmark
La manticora, a 1974 novel by Alfredo Pareja Diezcanseco

See also
Manticore (disambiguation)
Maticora, Malaysian coral snake